Mount Burnett may refer to:

Mount Burnett (Antarctica)
Mount Burnett (New Zealand)
Mount Burnett, Victoria in Australia
Mount Burnett, Queensland in Australia